Kudelka or Kudělka (feminine: Kudelková or Kudělková) is a surname. Notable people include:

 David Kudělka, Czech ice hockey player
 Frank Darío Kudelka (born 1961), Argentine football manager
 Frank Kudelka (1925–1993), American basketball player
 James Kudelka (born 1955), Canadian choreographer and dancer
 Peter Kudelka (born 1988), Slovak ice hockey player
 Tomáš Kudělka (born 1987), Czech ice hockey player

See also
 
 Koudelka (surname)

Czech-language surnames
Slovak-language surnames